Breg pri Sinjem Vrhu is a small settlement on the left bank of the Kolpa River in the Municipality of Črnomelj in the White Carniola area of southeastern Slovenia. The area is part of the traditional region of Lower Carniola and is now included in the Southeast Slovenia Statistical Region.

Name
The name of the settlement was changed from Breg to Breg pri Sinjem Vrhu in 1952.

References

External links
Breg pri Sinjem Vrhu on Geopedia

Populated places in the Municipality of Črnomelj